Christina Hengster (born 4 February 1986) is an Austrian bobsledder who has competed since 2004. Her best World Cup finish was 2nd in the two-woman event in Park City, United States in January 2016.

Hengster's best finish at the FIBT World Championships was 17th in the two-woman event at Lake Placid, New York in 2009.

References
IBSF profile

1986 births
Living people
Austrian female bobsledders
Olympic bobsledders of Austria
Bobsledders at the 2014 Winter Olympics
Bobsledders at the 2018 Winter Olympics